Special Order 191 (series 1862), also known as the "Lost Dispatch" and the "Lost Order", was a general movement order issued by Confederate Army General Robert E. Lee on about September 9, 1862, during the Maryland Campaign of the American Civil War. A lost copy of this order was recovered on September 13 by Union Army troops in Frederick County, Maryland, and the subsequent military intelligence gained by the Union played an important role in the Battle of South Mountain and Battle of Antietam.

History

Drafting 
The order was drafted on or about September 9, 1862, during the Maryland Campaign. It gave details of the movements of the Army of Northern Virginia during the early days of its invasion of Maryland. Lee divided his army, which he planned to regroup later; according to the precise text Major General Stonewall Jackson was to move his command to Martinsburg while McLaws's command and Walker's command "endeavored to capture Harpers Ferry." Major General James Longstreet was to move his command northward to Boonsborough. Major General D. H. Hill's division was to act as rear guard on the march from Frederick.

Lee delineated the routes and roads to be taken and the timing for the investment of Harpers Ferry. Adjutant Robert H. Chilton penned copies of the letter and endorsed them in Lee's name. Staff officers distributed the copies to various Confederate generals. Jackson in turn copied the document for one of his subordinates, D. H. Hill, who was to exercise independent command as the rear guard. Hill said the only copy he received was the one from Jackson.

Union discovery of lost copy 
About noon on September 13, Corporal Barton W. Mitchell of the 27th Indiana Volunteers, part of the Union XII Corps, discovered an envelope with three cigars wrapped in a piece of paper lying in the grass at a campground that Hill had just vacated. Mitchell realized the significance of the document and turned it in to Sergeant John M. Bloss. They went to Captain Peter Kopp, who sent it to regimental commander Colonel Silas Colgrove, who carried it to the corps headquarters. There, an aide to Brigadier General Alpheus S. Williams recognized the signature of R. H. Chilton, the assistant adjutant general who had signed the order. Williams's aide, Colonel Samuel  Pittman, recognized Chilton's  signature because Pittman frequently paid drafts drawn under Chilton's signature before the war. Pittman worked for a Detroit bank during the period when Chilton was paymaster at a nearby army post. Williams forwarded the dispatch to Major General George B. McClellan, the commander of the Army of the Potomac.

McClellan was overcome with glee at learning planned Confederate troop movements and reportedly exclaimed, "Now I know what to do!" He confided to Brigadier General John Gibbon, "Here is a paper with which, if I cannot whip Bobby Lee, I will be willing to go home."

Effect 
The National Park Service provides ample evidence that Lee did not know that McClellan had a copy of the orders until well after the Maryland Campaign was over, in spite of Lee's comments to the contrary in a 1868 letter, while also noting that two Northern newspapers reported no later than September 15 that Union officers had Lee's orders. Indeed, on the morning of September 15, 1862, the New York Herald, the North’s biggest newspaper, printed the following bulletin on the right-hand column on its front page:WASHINGTON, Sept. 14, 1862

Officers who left Frederick this morning report that a general order of General Lee was found there, directing that two columns of the rebel army should proceed by way of Middletown, one of them destined for Greencastle, Pa., with all possible expedition, and the other to proceed by way of Williamsport or Shepherdstown, at discretion, to engage the Union forces at Harper's Ferrry. [sic]The reasons this was both printed and overlooked are explored here.

McClellan stopped Lee's invasion at the subsequent Battle of Antietam, but many military historians believe he failed to fully exploit the strategic advantage of the intelligence because he was concerned about a possible trap (Major General Henry W. Halleck had been concerned that "Lee might draw McClellan and the army away from Washington, then turn and attack the city") or gross overestimation of the strength of Lee's army.

Legacy 
The hill on the Best Farm where the lost order was discovered is located outside of Frederick, Maryland, and was a key Confederate artillery position in the 1864 Battle of Monocacy. A historical marker on the Monocacy National Battlefield commemorates the finding of Special Order 191 during the Maryland Campaign.

Corporal Mitchell, who found the orders, was subsequently wounded in the leg at Antietam and was discharged in 1864 due to the resulting chronic infection. He died in 1868 at the age of 52.

Special Orders, No. 191

References
 "Civil War Papers of Samuel E. Pittman, Lt. Col., 1861-1925." Am Mss Pittman. Chapin Library, Williams College.
 Harsh, Joseph L. Taken at the Flood: Robert E. Lee & Confederate Strategy in the Maryland Campaign of 1862. 1999, .
 Jones, Wilbur D., Who Lost the Lost Order?.
 Leigh, Philip "Lee's Lost Dispatch and Other Civil War Controversies." (Yardley, Penna.: Westholme Publishing, 2015), 
 Sears, Stephen W., Landscape Turned Red: The Battle of Antietam, 1983 (1985 Popular Library edition), .
 Seeds/McMoneagle, "Civil War Lost Order Mystery Solved", 2012 (Logistics News Network, LLC. on The Evidential Details Mystery Series Imprint)

Notes

External links

 

American Civil War documents
Frederick County, Maryland
General orders
Maryland in the American Civil War
1862 documents